Megistostigma is a genus of plant of the family Euphorbiaceae first described as a genus in 1887. It is native to southern China, Assam, and Southeast Asia.

Species
 Megistostigma burmanicum - Assam, Myanmar, Thailand, Perlis
 Megistostigma cordatum - Sumatra, Sabah, Samar
 Megistostigma glabratum - Peninsular Malaysia, Anamba Islands, N Sumatra
 Megistostigma peltatum - Siberut, Natuna, Java
 Megistostigma yunnanense - Yunnan

References

Plukenetieae
Euphorbiaceae genera